The Hayesbrook School is a non-selective boys (mixed Sixth Form) secondary school with academy status in Tonbridge, Kent, United Kingdom. It has specialisms in Sports and Mathematics.

Location
Hayesbrook is located in Brook Street, Tonbridge. It is next to The Judd School and close to West Kent College.

History
In 1985, Andrew Skipjack was one of the winners of The Times fifth computer competition, winning an Atari 600XL and a copy of The Times Atlas of World History.

Academy and sponsorship
In December 2010, Hayesbrook was the first secondary school in West Kent to gain academy status.

In September 2012,  The Hayesbrook Academy Trust took over Angley School in Cranbrook, Kent which was subsequently renamed the High Weald Academy.

In August 2013, The Hayesbrook Academy Trust changed its name to The Brook Learning Trust, which coincided with the sponsorship of The Swan Valley Community School in Swanscombe to gain academy status - changing its name to The Ebbsfleet Academy.

Houses
Hayesbrook has five houses (or teams, as the school calls them), all named after famous Athletes: Ali, Pelé, MacArthur, Redgrave, and Thompson.

Ofsted
The school was classed as "Excellent" by Ofsted in 2005, 2008 and 2009.

In 2013 the school was rated as "Good", with "Outstanding" behaviour and safety of pupils.

References

Secondary schools in Kent
Boys' schools in Kent
Schools in Tonbridge
Academies in Kent